Paul Gerard McGee (born 19 June 1954) is an Irish former footballer who played as a forward.

McGee was born in Sligo, and started his career with Sligo Rovers, making his debut at 15 years of age on 15 November 1970. While at Finn Harps he won the FAI Cup in 1974. He then rejoined his home town club Sligo Rovers winning the League of Ireland championship in 1977. After the league success he was purchased by Queens Park Rangers in November 1977. In his Ireland career, he scored 4 goals in 15 matches and also won 10 youth caps and 2 U21 caps. In January 1977 he played for the League of Ireland XI team against Italian League B which included Gaetano Scirea.

He had 6 different spells during his career playing for Sligo. He played at FC Haka in the 1983–84 European Cup Winners' Cup. In played several summer months abroad in the National Soccer League with Toronto Italia, and Montreal Castors.

McGee signed for Shamrock Rovers in August 1984. He made a scoring debut with 2 goals on the 26th against Home Farm in a 4–2 win at Milltown. His last appearance was against his home town club in a 4–0 win on 11 November 1978. In total he played 15 times for the Hoops, including twice in the European Cup, scoring 5 goals.

While at Galway United he scored in the 1986–87 UEFA Cup at FC Groningen. His impressive displays earned him a move to HFC Haarlem for the rest of the 1986–87 Eredivisie season. During his time there his opponents included Marco van Basten and Ruud Gullit.

He is currently Galway United's all-time top goalscorer in the League of Ireland. He was also the club's player-manager during the 1989–90 season. He moved to Derry City for the 1990–91 League of Ireland Premier Division season but by November he had moved back to his home town club. However, he did play in the 1990–91 UEFA Cup for the Candystripes.

In January 1993 McGee moved clubs for the 34th occasion, a record for an Irish player.

In January 2007, McGee was appointed manager of Limerick 37 F.C. He was sacked in December despite an impressive 4th-place position

In January 2008 he was appointed assistant manager to Alan Mathews at Cork City. In August 2008 he lost his job as Cork went into examinership. In May 2011 McGee was appointed manager of Salthill Devon

At the end of the 2012 League of Ireland season McGee is eleventh in the all-time League of Ireland goalscoring list with 143 league goals

Honours
League of Ireland
 Sligo Rovers – 1976–77
FAI Cup
 Finn Harps – 1974
 League of Ireland Cup
 Galway United – 1985/86
 League of Ireland First Division Shield
 Galway United – 1992/93
 English Football League Third Division 
 Burnley – 1981–82

References

External links
 

1954 births
Association football forwards
Athlone Town A.F.C. players
Ballymena United F.C. players
Burnley F.C. players
Derry City F.C. players
Dundalk F.C. players
Eredivisie players
Expatriate soccer players in Canada
Expatriate footballers in England
Expatriate footballers in the Netherlands
Finn Harps F.C. players
Galway United F.C. (1937–2011) players
Hereford United F.C. players
HFC Haarlem players
Irish expatriate sportspeople in Canada
Irish expatriate sportspeople in England
Irish expatriate sportspeople in the Netherlands
Montreal Castors players
NIFL Premiership players
Kidderminster Harriers F.C. players
League of Ireland managers
League of Ireland players
League of Ireland XI players
Living people
People from Sligo (town)
Preston North End F.C. players
Queens Park Rangers F.C. players
Republic of Ireland association footballers
Republic of Ireland international footballers
Republic of Ireland under-21 international footballers
Republic of Ireland youth international footballers
Republic of Ireland expatriate association footballers
Shamrock Rovers F.C. players
Sligo Rovers F.C. players
Association footballers from County Sligo
English Football League players
Toronto Italia players
Torquay United F.C. players
Waterford F.C. players
Salthill Devon F.C. managers
Galway United F.C. managers
Canadian National Soccer League players
Republic of Ireland football managers